Andrew Edward Fletcher (February 1, 1895 - October 15, 1978) was an American football player. He played college football as a back at the University of Maryland, and earned varsity letters in 1916 and 1917. Fletcher then had a brief professional playing career in the fledgling National Football League (NFL). In 1920, he played two games for the Buffalo All-Americans. The following season, in 1921, Fletcher played one game for Tonawanda Kardex.

References

Maryland Terrapins football players
Buffalo All-Americans players

1895 births
1978 deaths